Hacıhəsənli is a village and municipality in the Tovuz Rayon of Azerbaijan. It has a population of 552.

References

Populated places in Tovuz District